The Kawasaki 340 is a Japanese twin-cylinder, in-line, two-stroke engine that was designed for snowmobiles and produced by Kawasaki Heavy Industries until the early 1980s. The engine was available in air-cooled and liquid-cooled versions.

The engine was widely adapted for other purposes, including ultralight aircraft. Kawasaki did not condone or support the use of the engine in aircraft and it was largely supplanted in this role by the similar purpose-designed Rotax 377 aircraft engine.

Design and development
The Kawasaki 340 is very similar in design to the Kawasaki 440, using a smaller piston.

The engine has two cylinders in an in-line configuration. The single ignition system uses a coil and points. Fuel is metered by a carburetor and the engine has oil injection. Starting is by a recoil starter system with electric start as an option.

In its aircraft applications the 340 uses one of several available aftermarket reduction drive systems to reduce the maximum 6800 rpm to a speed more manageable for propeller use.

Variants
340-FA
Free Air-cooled version
340-LC
Liquid-cooled version

Applications

Specifications (340-LC)

See also

References

Air-cooled aircraft piston engines
Two-stroke aircraft piston engines